Thecophora atra is a species of small fly in the family Conopidae subfamily Myopinae.

This species is mainly present in Belgium, British Isles, France, Germany, Italy, Poland, Portugal, Spain and Switzerland.

Thorax and abdomen of this very small conopid is mainly greyish-black. The head is quite large, the snout is elongated with narrow white cheeks, the large eyes are reddish, the second segment of antennae is much longer than the third and femur 1 and 2 are brown or black, while femur 3 is yellowish on its basal half.

Their larvae are endoparasites of small solitary bees, probably of the genus Halictus and Lasioglossum (Halictidae species).

References
 Smith, K. G. V. (1969) -  Diptera: Conopidae - [Handbooks for the Identification of British Insects]
 Mark van Veen - Thecophora Keys

External links
 Biolib
 Fauna Europaea

Conopidae
Insects described in 1775
Endoparasites
Taxa named by Johan Christian Fabricius